Vladimir Aleksandrovich Kondratiev (2 July 1935 – 11 March 2010) was a Russian mathematician and professor. He worked particularly in the field of ordinary differential equations and partial differential equations.

Prizes 
 USSR State Prize (1988)
 Petrovsky Prize of the Russian Academy of Sciences (1998)
 Lomonosov Prize of Moscow State University (2009)

Publications

Books

Weblinks 
All-Russian Mathematical Portal entry

References 

 1935 births
 2010 deaths
 20th-century Russian mathematicians
 21st-century Russian mathematicians